Backstreet Dreams may refer to:

 Backstreet Dreams (album), a 1993 album by Blue System
 Backstreet Dreams (film), a 1990 drama film starring Brooke Shields